The Premier League Cup is an English football competition run by the Premier League for under-21 sides.

History
The competition was created in 2013 as the U21 Premier League Cup, an U21 equivalent of the FA Youth Cup (an U18 competition competed for since 1952), albeit being run by the Premier League instead of The FA. In 2016 the age range of the competition was raised to Under-23s, and the competition was renamed as simply the Premier League Cup. 

In 2017, the Premier League introduced the U18 Premier League Cup and U16 Premier League Cup (which was changed to the U17 Premier League Cup in 2020) for their respective age groups.

In 2022, the age limit changed back to Under-21 - to match changes in the Premier League 2.

Winners

Finals

 – aggregate score

U18 Finals

U16/17 Finals

Records
Record attendance:  
12,356Southampton vs. Blackburn Rovers, Final second leg, 20 April 2015
Record win:
8–0Aston Villa  vs. Bristol City, Group Stage,  5 October 2018

Highest scoring game: 
10 goalsNorwich City 5–5 Fulham, Round of 16, 17 March 2017

See also
 FA Cup
 FA Youth Cup
 Professional Development League

References

 
Recurring sporting events established in 2013
Youth football cup competitions in England
2013 establishments in England
Cup